The 53rd Academy of Country Music Awards was held at the MGM Grand Garden Arena in Las Vegas, Nevada on April 15, 2018. Nominations were announced on March 1, 2018, with Chris Stapleton leading the nominations with five. Reba McEntire returned as host for the first time in six years, making it the fifteenth time she has hosted the show.

Winners and Nominees 
The winners are shown in bold.

Performances

Source:

Presenters

See also

Academy of Country Music Awards

References

Academy of Country Music Awards
Academy of Country Music Awards
Academy of Country Music Awards
Academy of Country Music Awards
Academy of Country Music Awards
Academy of Country Music Awards
Academy of Country Music Awards